Han Oak is a restaurant serving Korean cuisine in Portland, Oregon's Kerns neighborhood, in the United States. Owned by chef Peter Cho and partner Sun Young Park, Han Oak was The Oregonian Restaurant of the Year in 2017.

See also

 History of Korean Americans in Portland, Oregon
 List of Korean restaurants

References

External links
 

Asian restaurants in Portland, Oregon
Kerns, Portland, Oregon
Korean restaurants in the United States
Korean-American culture in Portland, Oregon
Northeast Portland, Oregon
Year of establishment missing